The 48 Group Club (originally, the 48 Group of British Traders with China) is a London-based nonprofit organisation dedicated to promoting trade between the People's Republic of China (PRC) and the United Kingdom. The group is named after a British trade delegation of 48 businessmen, referred to as the "Icebreakers," who traveled to China in 1954 to establish trading relations between the two countries. The organisation's motto, "Equality and Mutual Benefit," is derived from a quote by Zhou Enlai, the first Premier of the People's Republic of China. Critics have contended that the organisation has functioned as a platform for the Chinese Communist Party (CCP) to influence British elites.

Fellows of the 48 Group Club have included Tony Blair, Jack Straw, Alex Salmond, Peter Mandelson, Ken Livingstone, and other politicians, retired diplomats, and prominent business executives. The 48 Group Club's chairman, Stephen Perry, has been a proponent of the Belt and Road Initiative and his commentary has been published by Chinese state media outlets. In February 2020, Perry commented positively on the PRC's response to the COVID-19 pandemic and stated that the Chinese government showed "incredible sensitivity to the needs of the people."

Criticism 
In Hidden Hand: Exposing How The Chinese Communist Party Is Reshaping The World, authors Clive Hamilton and Mareike Ohlberg stated:

Libel lawsuit 
In June 2020, the 48 Group Club and its chairman Stephen Perry launched a libel lawsuit in a failed attempt to block the publication of the book in Canada, the United Kingdom, and the United States.

See also 
 Society for Anglo-Chinese Understanding
 Chinese People's Association for Friendship with Foreign Countries

References

External links 
 

Foreign policy and strategy think tanks based in the United Kingdom
Political and economic think tanks based in the United Kingdom
1954 establishments in the United Kingdom
Organizations established in 1954
China–United Kingdom relations
United Kingdom friendship associations
People's Republic of China friendship associations